May-Helen Molvær Grimstad (born 31 January 1968 in Ålesund) is a Norwegian politician for the Christian Democratic Party.

She was elected to the Norwegian Parliament from Møre og Romsdal in 1993, and has been re-elected on three occasions.

References

1968 births
Living people
Christian Democratic Party (Norway) politicians
Politicians from Ålesund
Members of the Storting
Women members of the Storting
21st-century Norwegian politicians
21st-century Norwegian women politicians
20th-century Norwegian politicians
20th-century Norwegian women politicians